Natalia Gussoni (born 24 August 1981) is a retired Argentine tennis player.

Gussoni has career-high WTA rankings of 134 in singles, achieved on 3 May 2004, and 220 in doubles, reached on 5 July 2004. She won seven singles and three doubles titles on the ITF Circuit.

Playing for Argentina in Fed Cup competitions, Gussoni has a win–loss record of 3–3.

ITF Circuit finals

Singles: 15 (7 titles, 8 runner-ups)

Doubles (3 titles, 13 runner-ups)

References

External links
 
 
 

1981 births
Living people
Argentine female tennis players
21st-century Argentine women